Fred Lindsay Deal (September 3, 1911 in Lenoir, North Carolina – April 18, 1979 in Little Rock, Arkansas), was a professional baseball player who played outfield for the 1939 Brooklyn Dodgers.

He was player/manager of the Greenville Bucks of the Cotton States League in 1948.

External links

1911 births
1979 deaths
Atlanta Crackers players
Baltimore Orioles scouts
Baseball players from North Carolina
Brooklyn Dodgers players
Greenville Bucks players
Knoxville Smokies players
Little Rock Travelers players
Louisville Colonels (minor league) players
Major League Baseball outfielders
Memphis Chickasaws players
Meridian Peps players
Minor league baseball managers
Montreal Royals players
People from Lenoir, North Carolina
Syracuse Chiefs players